Danny Stack is an Irish screenwriter and film director, best known for his work in children's television. He is also the co-host of The UK Scriptwriters Podcast, a weekly series of interviews with prominent writers and producers in UK film and television, as well as advice for getting into the industry.

Career
After working as a special effects assistant and then a film critic for JMTV, Stack moved to England and began working for Channel 4's Entertainment department. He also worked as a freelance script reader for Miramax, Working Title and Pathe. In 2004, Stack won the BBCNI Tony Doyle Bursary Award for New Writing. He gained his first writing credit on The Amazing Adrenalini Brothers, followed by Doctors and EastEnders. He subsequently moved into children's television, writing for series such as Hey Duggee, Thunderbirds Are Go, PJ Masks, Octonauts and Transformers: Rescue Bots Academy.

He helped set up the Red Planet Prize, a screenwriting award run by Red Planet Pictures, the production company of Tony Jordan. Its first winner was Robert Thorogood, whose script became Death in Paradise.

With Tim Clague, Stack founded Nelson Nutmeg Pictures, a production company focusing on low budget children's films and television projects. Their first feature was Who Killed Nelson Nutmeg?, starring Bonnie Wright. The film premiered on 10 October 2015 at the 59th BFI London Film Festival. In 2020, the pair released their preschool series, Dog Years, on kidoodle.tv, a family-friendly streaming service.

Their next film, a science-fiction children's feature titled Future TX, premiered at the Cinemagic Festival in Belfast on 15th October 2022, with a limited theatrical after. In 2023, it was announced Stack and Clague were developing a new animated series, Buddybots, for Creation Entertainment Media and Magic Frame Animation .

Teaching
Stack has lectured on screenwriting. In addition, he co-authored two guide books with Clague, The UK Scriptwriters Survival Handbook: or How to Earn an Actual Living as a Writer in 2015, followed by Write a Script in 10 Weeks in 2017.

Filmography

References

External links
 Official Website
 

21st-century Irish writers
21st-century Irish male writers
Irish film directors
Irish screenwriters
Irish male screenwriters
Screenwriting instructors
Year of birth missing (living people)
Living people